The 2021–22 LUB season was the 19th season of the Liga Uruguaya de Básquetbol (LUB), the highest level basketball league in Uruguay. 

The number of teams was expanded to 14 teams this season.

Biguá won their fourth LUB championship, Donald Sims was named the Finals MVP.

Teams

Changes

Arenas

Regular season 

Source: NBB; (R): Relegated.

Playoffs 
The highest placed teams in the play-in series (denoted with a * next to their name) began the series with a 1–0 advantage.

Statistics

Individual statistical leaders 
After the regular season.

References 

2021–22 in basketball leagues
Liga Uruguaya de Basketball